Condemned 84 are an English Street Punk [Oi!]] band. According to their website, the band was formed in 1980 as Criminal Tendencies, changing their name in 1983 to Condemned, and in 1984 to Condemned 84. 

In 1986 the band playing on the bill organised by VFM Scooter rally organisation on the Isle of Wight at the annual scooter rally one of their concerts deteriorated into a riot. This was nothing to do with the bands performance as there were 
performances by several other Oi! bands, including The Business and Vicious Rumours, which drew a number of skinheads, and following the concert, some attendees attacked vendors, caterers and security staff. This was not an event organised by Condemned 84.

They are often confused with their contemporaries Combat 84 due to the similar band names and the fact that the band did release an album on the same label way after Rock-O-Rama.
The band have had various Line up changes over the past 40 odd years due to members now deceased or left the band. 
Many lies and un-truths have since been written about the band on various platforms and this has sadly vilified the band outside the mainstream corporate Punk, Oi scene where since this day the band have always just done their own thing, with slogans such as No Bullshit - No Politics on promotional material to highlight their dis-interest in pandering to any kind of alliances. 
The band have always stated their aim is to spread the word of Street Punk, Oi!, skinhead, bootboy music to the masses and continue to do say to this day.

Discography
As per the Condemned 84 official website:

Albums
Battle Scarred (Oi! Records, 1986)
Face the Aggression (Grade 1 Records, 1988)
Live & Loud (Link Records, 1989)
Storming to Power (Rock-O-Rama, 1992)
Amongst the Thugs (Step-1 Music, 1995)
Blood On Yer Face (R 'n' B Records, 1999)
No One Likes Us... We Don't Care (Hit Records, 2004)
In From the Darkness (Haunted Town Records, 2011)

Singles and EPs
5-track Demo Tape Cassette (self released)
Oi! Ain't Dead EP (RFB Records, 1986)
In Search of the New Breed EP (RFB Records, 1987)
Euro '96 EP (Grade 1 Records, 1995)
"Bootboys" / "In Yer Face" - (Hammer Records, 1999)
"Battle" / "No Way In" (Haunted Town Records, 2003)
The Real Oi! EP (Haunted Town Records, 2011)
"When They Stick The Knife In"/ "One In A Million Voices" 7" and cd. (P.S.T. Records, 2019)

Compilations
The Boots Go Marching In (Rock-O-Rama, 1991)
Battle Scarred/Live & Loud (Street Punk Records, 1993)
The Best Of (Step-1 Music, 2005)

References

External links
Official site
Discography on Discogs

Street punk groups
Musical groups established in 1980
English punk rock groups
Oi! groups